Wat Rong Khun, better known as the White Temple, is a privately owned art exhibit in the style of a Buddhist temple in Pa O Don Chai, Mueang District, Chiang Rai Province, Thailand. It is owned by Chalermchai Kositpipat, who designed, constructed, and opened it to visitors in 1997.

History
By the end of the 20th century, the original Wat Rong Khun was in a bad state of repair. Funds were not available for renovation. Chalermchai Kositpipat, a local artist from Chiang Rai, decided to completely rebuild the temple and fund the project with his own money. To date, Chalermchai has spent THB 1,080 million on the project. The artist intends for the area adjacent to the temple to be a center of learning and meditation and for people to gain benefit from the Buddhist teachings. Kositpipat considers the temple to be an offering to Lord Buddha and believes the project will give him immortal life. Today the works are ongoing, but are not expected to be completed until 2070.

Structures and symbolism
When completed, the white temple compound will have nine buildings, including the existing ubosot, a hall of relics, a meditation hall, an art gallery, and living quarters for monks.

The bridge of "the cycle of rebirth" 
The main building at the white temple, the ubosot, is reached by crossing a bridge over a small lake. In front of the bridge are hundreds of outreaching hands that symbolize unrestrained desire. The bridge proclaims that the way to happiness is by foregoing temptation, greed, and desire. Next to the lake stand two very elegant Kinnaree, half-human, half-bird creatures from Buddhist mythology.

Gate of Heaven 
After crossing the bridge, the visitor arrives at the "gate of heaven", guarded by two creatures representing Death and Rahu, who decides the fate of the dead. In front of the ubosot are several meditative Buddha images.

The golden building 

A structure that stands out because of its color is the rest rooms building. Another very ornately decorated structure, this golden building represents the body, whereas the white ubosot represents the mind. The gold symbolizes how people focus on worldly desires and money. The white building represents the idea to make merit and to focus on the mind, instead of material things and possession.

Ubosot 
The principal building, the ubosot is an all-white building with fragments of mirrored glass embedded in the building's exterior. The ubosot embodies design elements from classic Thai architecture such as the three-tiered roof and abundant use of Naga serpents. "Inside the temple, the decor swiftly moves from pristine white to fiery and bewildering. Murals depict swirling orange flames and demon faces, interspersed with Western idols such as Michael Jackson, Neo from The Matrix, Freddy Krueger, and a T-800 series Terminator. Images of nuclear warfare, terrorist attacks such as the World Trade Center attack, and oil pumps hammer home the destructive impact that humans have had on earth. The presence of Harry Potter, Superman, and Hello Kitty confuses the message somewhat, but the overall moral is clear: people are wicked.

2014 earthquake
On 5 May 2014 at 18:08 (local time), the temple was damaged by the earthquake in Mae Lao that struck the province. It was planned to be closed indefinitely. Chalermchai said on 6 May that he would demolish the structures for safety reasons and would not rebuild it.

On May 7, after an engineering expert team inspected and affirmed that all buildings in the compound were structurally unharmed by the quake, Chalermchai announced that he would restore the temple to its original state in two years and promised to devote his life to the work. He also announced that the temple area will be open to visitors from 8 May. The gallery building opened shortly thereafter. But for some buildings, specifically, ubosot itself, visitors are only allowed to take pictures outside.

Visiting 

The structure is open year-round. Donations are accepted, but are not to exceed THB 10,000, as Chalermchai refuses to be influenced by big donors.

Photos

See also
Luang Pu Bunleua Sulilat / Sala Keoku / Buddha Park
Lek Viriyaphant / Sanctuary of Truth /  Ancient Siam / Erawan Museum
Wat Pa Maha Chedi Kaew
Visionary environments
Hsinbyume Pagoda – White pagoda in Myanmar
Le Palais idéal

References

External links

https://www.facebook.com/วัดร่องขุ่น-Wat-Rong-Khun-White-Temple-Chiang-Rai-Thailand-215028701875011/
An image gallery
Wat Rong Khun - White Temple of Northern Thailand 
White Temple Chiang Rai

Visionary environments
Tourist attractions in Chiang Rai province
Sculptures in Thailand
Thai contemporary art